Kramgoa låtar 14 is a 1986 Vikingarna studio album.

Track listing

Side A
Ljus och värme (Lys og varme) - 3.37 (Å.Alexandersen-B.Borg)
Oki Doki - 2.34 (J.Kennedy-E&A.Ljusberg)
I dina kvarter - 3.57 (F.Loewe-G.Rybrant)
Lilla vän (Wooden Heart) - 2.13 (Trad.arr: L.O.Carlsson/M.Forsberg)
Säj du, säj jag (Say You, Say Me) - 3.50 (L.Richie-M.Borgström)
Drömmar av silver (Beautiful Dreamer) - 2.48 (Trad.arr: L.O.Carlsson-H.Iseborg)
Följ mä ôss te Värmeland - 2.44 (G.Brown-Alfson)

Side B
Nikita - 3.56 (E.John-Taupin-T.Hagman)
Midnatt - 3.10 (M.Contra-K.Almgren/ILO)
Huller om buller - 3.05 (J.Blomqvist-L.Berghagen)
Käre John (instrumental) - 2.36 (L.Talley-S.Owens)
Livets gång (Walk of Life) - 3.02 (M.Knopfler-M.Borgström)
Får jag lov - 2.35 (L.Olsson-M.Forsberg)
When You're Smiling - 2.30 (J.Goodwin-L.Shay)

Contributors
Choir - Liza Öhman, Lotta Pedersen, Lasse Westmann
Guitar - Hasse Rosén
Steelguitar - Janne Lundgren
Synthesizer - Peter Ljung
Strings - Swedish Radio Symphony Orchestra

Charts

References 

1986 albums
Vikingarna (band) albums
Swedish-language albums